Mikael Kuronen (born March 14, 1992) is a Finnish professional ice hockey player currently playing for SaiPa in the SM-liiga.

Kuronen made his SM-liiga debut playing with Ilves during the 2011–12 SM-liiga season.

Personal life
His father Hannu played professional hockey in the Liiga for eight seasons and his brother Markus also played hockey.

References

External links

1992 births
Living people
Finnish ice hockey forwards
Ilves players
SaiPa players
Ice hockey people from Tampere